The 1975 European Karate Championships, the 8th edition, was held  in Valencia, Spain from May 5 to 7, 1973.

Competition

Team

References

1973
International karate competitions hosted by Spain
European Karate Championships
European championships in 1973
Sports competitions in Valencia
Karate competitions in Spain
20th century in Valencia
May 1973 sports events in Europe